Potok is a small settlement in the hills east of Idrija in the traditional Inner Carniola region. It include the hamlet of Mravljišče west of the main village center.

Name

The name of the settlement literally means 'creek, stream'. Jakopnik Creek, which eventually feeds the Poljane Sora River, flows through the village.

References

External links

Potok on Geopedia

Populated places in the Municipality of Idrija